Benjamin Franklin Howey (March 17, 1828 – February 6, 1893) was an American lawyer and Republican politician who represented New Jersey's 4th congressional district in the United States House of Representatives for one term from 1883 to 1885.

Early life and career
Howey was born in Pleasant Meadows, near Swedesboro, Gloucester County, New Jersey.

He engaged in business in Philadelphia, Pennsylvania as a flour and grain commission merchant in 1847 and later in quarrying and manufacturing slate. He served as captain of Company G, Thirty-first Regiment, New Jersey Volunteers, from September 3, 1862, to June 26, 1863 and as sheriff of Warren County, New Jersey, from November 13, 1878, to November 15, 1881.

Congress
Howey was elected as a Republican to the Forty-eighth Congress, serving in office from March 4, 1883 – March 3, 1885.

Death
He died in Columbia, New Jersey, and is interred in Trinity Church Cemetery in Swedesboro.

External links

 Retrieved on 2009-03-25
Benjamin Franklin Howey at The Political Graveyard

1828 births
1895 deaths
People from Swedesboro, New Jersey
People of New Jersey in the American Civil War
Burials in New Jersey
Republican Party members of the United States House of Representatives from New Jersey
19th-century American politicians